Balázs Korányi (born 30 May 1974, in Budapest) is a retired Hungarian middle-distance runner who specialised in the 800 metres. He finished fourth at the 1999 World Indoor Championships.

Competition record

Personal bests
Outdoor
600 metres – 1:16.33 (Florø 1999) NR
800 metres – 1:45.39 (Roma 1999)
Indoor
600 metres – 1:16.59 (Stange 1999) NR
800 metres – 1:46.47 (Maebashi 1999) NR

References

1974 births
Living people
Hungarian male middle-distance runners
Athletes (track and field) at the 1996 Summer Olympics
Athletes (track and field) at the 2000 Summer Olympics
Olympic athletes of Hungary
Athletes from Budapest
20th-century Hungarian people